Jilt or  may refer to:

 Jilț, a tributary of the river Jiu in Romania
 Jilț Coal Mine, an open-pit mine in Romania 
 The Jilt, a 1922 American drama film directed by Irving Cummings
 A B-girl (archaic term for a bargirl) - see Jilt shop